The 2022–23 Converge FiberXers season was the first season of the franchise in the Philippine Basketball Association (PBA).

Key dates
May 15: The PBA Season 47 draft was held at the Robinsons Place Manila in Manila.

Draft picks

Roster

Philippine Cup

Eliminations

Standings

Game log

|-bgcolor=ffcccc
| 1
| June 5
| Rain or Shine
| L 77–79
| Jeron Teng (23)
| Jeron Teng (13)
| RK Ilagan (4)
| Smart Araneta Coliseum8,241
| 0–1
|-bgcolor=ccffcc
| 2
| June 10
| Magnolia
| W 89–82 (OT)
| Jeron Teng (19)
| Justin Arana (12)
| Maverick Ahanmisi (6)
| Ynares Center
| 1–1
|-bgcolor=ffcccc
| 3
| June 12
| TNT
| L 83–86
| Mike Tolomia (17)
| Justin Arana (8)
| Ahanmisi, Teng (4)
| Ynares Center
| 1–2
|-bgcolor=ffcccc
| 4
| June 16
| Meralco
| L 74–90
| Taylor Browne (14)
| Jeo Ambohot (11)
| Alec Stockton (5)
| Ynares Center
| 1–3
|-bgcolor=ccffcc
| 5
| June 22
| Terrafirma
| W 97–84
| Michael DiGregorio (19)
| Justin Arana (12)
| Maverick Ahanmisi (8)
| SM Mall of Asia Arena
| 2–3
|-bgcolor=ffcccc
| 6
| June 26
| San Miguel
| L 92–111
| Allyn Bulanadi (22)
| Justin Arana (6)
| Maverick Ahanmisi (7)
| Ynares Center
| 2–4

|-bgcolor=ffcccc
| 7
| July 1
| Barangay Ginebra
| L 89–105
| Allyn Bulanadi (16)
| Adamos, Arana (8)
| Alec Stockton (5)
| Smart Araneta Coliseum
| 2–5
|-bgcolor=ccffcc
| 8
| July 7
| NLEX
| W 112–108
| David Murrell (21)
| Tyrus Hill (7)
| RK Ilagan (10)
| Smart Araneta Coliseum
| 3–5
|-bgcolor=ccffcc
| 9
| July 9
| NorthPort
| W 104–98
| RK Ilagan (20)
| Ahanmisi, Arana (10)
| Maverick Ahanmisi (6)
| Smart Araneta Coliseum
| 4–5
|-bgcolor=ffcccc
| 10
| July 16
| Phoenix
| L 66–89
| Hill, Tratter (9)
| Justin Arana (11)
| Mike Tolomia (4)
| SM Mall of Asia Arena
| 4–6
|-bgcolor=ccffcc
| 11
| July 20
| Blackwater
| W 92–90
| Maverick Ahanmisi (18)
| Abu Tratter (10)
| Maverick Ahanmisi (7)
| Smart Araneta Coliseum
| 5–6

Playoffs

Bracket

Game log

|-bgcolor=ffcccc
| 1
| July 27
| TNT
| L 95–116
| Tyrus Hill (18)
| Abu Tratter (11)
| Ilagan, Murrell (4)
| Smart Araneta Coliseum
| 0–1

Commissioner's Cup

Eliminations

Standings

Game log

|-bgcolor=ccffcc
| 1
| September 23, 2022
| Terrafirma
| W 124–110
| Quincy Miller (38)
| Quincy Miller (16)
| Maverick Ahanmisi (7)
| PhilSports Arena
| 1–0

|-bgcolor=ffcccc
| 2
| October 1, 2022
| Magnolia
| L 105–109
| Quincy Miller (38)
| Quincy Miller (16)
| Maverick Ahanmisi (5)
| Smart Araneta Coliseum
| 1–1
|-bgcolor=ffcccc
| 3
| October 7, 2022
| Bay Area
| L 100–106
| Quincy Miller (38)
| Quincy Miller (14)
| Kevin Racal (5)
| Smart Araneta Coliseum
| 1–2
|-bgcolor=ccffcc
| 4
| October 15, 2022
| Meralco
| W 106–99
| Quincy Miller (29)
| Quincy Miller (16)
| Alec Stockton (6)
| Smart Araneta Coliseum
| 2–2
|-bgcolor=ccffcc
| 5
| October 21, 2022
| San Miguel
| W 106–102
| Quincy Miller (24)
| Quincy Miller (16)
| Aljun Melecio (7)
| PhilSports Arena
| 3–2
|-bgcolor=ccffcc
| 6
| October 28, 2022
| TNT
| W 130–117
| Quincy Miller (38)
| Quincy Miller (20)
| RK Ilagan (8)
| Smart Araneta Coliseum
| 4–2
|-bgcolor=ccffcc
| 7
| October 30, 2022
| Blackwater
| W 77–71
| Quincy Miller (22)
| Quincy Miller (19)
| Ahanmisi, Ilagan (3)
| Ynares Center
| 5–2

|-bgcolor=ccffcc
| 8
| November 5, 2022
| NLEX
| W 108–84
| Aljun Melecio (24)
| Jeo Ambohot (12)
| Ahanmisi, Melecio (6)
| Ynares Center
| 6–2
|-bgcolor=ccffcc
| 9
| November 9, 2022
| Phoenix
| W 132–127
| Quincy Miller (46)
| Quincy Miller (18)
| Quincy Miller (5)
| Smart Araneta Coliseum
| 7–2
|-bgcolor=ccffcc
| 10
| November 13, 2022
| Rain or Shine
| W 102–101
| Jeron Teng (20)
| Quincy Miller (20)
| RK Ilagan (6)
| Smart Araneta Coliseum
| 8–2
|-bgcolor=ffcccc
| 11
| November 20, 2022
| NorthPort
| L 97–112
| Aljun Melecio (20)
| Teng, Tratter (7)
| Aljun Melecio (8)
| Smart Araneta Coliseum
| 8–3
|-bgcolor=ffccc
| 12
| November 30, 2022
| Barangay Ginebra
| L 96–115
| Justin Arana (23)
| Quincy Miller (16)
| Aljun Melecio (4)
| PhilSports Arena
| 8–4

Playoffs

Bracket

Game log

|-bgcolor=ffcccc
| 1
| December 7, 2022
| San Miguel
| L 96–114
| Quincy Miller (41)
| Quincy Miller (13)
| Ilagan, Melecio (4)
| PhilSports Arena
| 0–1
|-bgcolor=ffcccc
| 2
| December 10, 2022
| San Miguel
| L 107–120
| Jeron Teng (25)
| Jeron Teng (10)
| Alec Stockton (5)
| PhilSports Arena
| 0–2

Governors' Cup

Eliminations

Standings

Game log

|-bgcolor=ccffcc
| 1
| January 22
| NorthPort
| W 122–92 
| Maverick Ahanmisi (29)
| Rusbatch, Teng (9)
| Maverick Ahanmisi (9)
| PhilSports Arena
| 1–0
|-bgcolor=ccffcc
| 2
| January 26
| Terrafirma
| W 130–115 
| Jamaal Franklin (42)
| Jamaal Franklin (11)
| Jamaal Franklin (8)
| PhilSports Arena
| 2–0
|-bgcolor=ccffcc
| 3
| January 29
| Magnolia
| W 111–109 
| Jamaal Franklin (26)
| Jamaal Franklin (13)
| Jamaal Franklin (7)
| Ynares Center
| 3–0

|-bgcolor=ccffcc
| 4
| February 2
| Rain or Shine
| W 112–98 
| Jamaal Franklin (25)
| Jamaal Franklin (13)
| Jamaal Franklin (15) 
| PhilSports Arena
| 4–0
|-bgcolor=ffcccc
| 5
| February 8
| TNT
| L 122–128
| Jamaal Franklin (47)
| Jamaal Franklin (14) 
| Jamaal Franklin (7)
| Smart Araneta Coliseum
| 4–1
|-bgcolor=ccffcc
| 6
| February 11
| San Miguel
| W 107–103 
| Jamaal Franklin (37) 
| Eboña, Franklin (9)
| Jamaal Franklin (7) 
| SM Mall of Asia Arena
| 5–1
|-bgcolor=ffcccc
| 7
| February 18
| NLEX
| L 112–116
| Jamaal Franklin (53) 
| Jamaal Franklin (11) 
| Jamaal Franklin (4) 
| Smart Araneta Coliseum
| 5–2
|-bgcolor=ccffcc
| 8
| February 23
| Blackwater
| W 98–90 
| Maverick Ahanmisi (31)
| Jamaal Franklin (15)
| Jamaal Franklin (5)
| PhilSports Arena
| 6–2
|-bgcolor=ffcccc
| 9
| February 26
| Phoenix
| L 103–106
| Jamaal Franklin (30)
| Jamaal Franklin (12)
| Jamaal Franklin (7)
| Smart Araneta Coliseum
| 6–3

|-bgcolor=ffcccc
| 10
| March 3
| Meralco
| L 129–132 (OT)
| Jamaal Franklin (57)
| Jamaal Franklin (14)
| Jamaal Franklin (11)
| Smart Araneta Coliseum
| 6–4
|-bgcolor=ffcccc
| 11
| March 5
| Barangay Ginebra
| L 101–120
| Maverick Ahanmisi (24)
| Maverick Ahanmisi (8)
| Jamaal Franklin (5)
| PhilSports Arena
| 6–5

Playoffs

Bracket

Game log

|-bgcolor=ffcccc
| 1
| March 19
| San Miguel
| L 105–121
| Tom Vodanovich (39)
| Tom Vodanovich (10)
| Ahanmisi, Stockton (4)
| Smart Araneta Coliseum
| 0–1

Transactions

Free agency

Signings

Trades

Pre-season

Philippine Cup

Mid-season

Commissioner's Cup

Recruited imports

References

Converge FiberXers seasons
Converge FiberXers